is a Japanese football player for FC Kariya.

Club statistics
Updated to 23 February 2020.

References

External links

Profile at Kamatamare Sanuki

1991 births
Living people
Takamatsu University alumni
Association football people from Kagawa Prefecture
Japanese footballers
J2 League players
J3 League players
Kamatamare Sanuki players
FC Kariya players
Association football forwards